

India

Poets
 Approximate date of Valmiki

Works
 Approximate date of the Ramayana

Ancient Greece

Poets (by date of birth)
 Homer, born near or before the beginning of the century
 Hesiod, born near or before the beginning of the century in Boeotia
 Callinus (c. 740 - c. 665 BC)
 Tyrtaeus (c. 700 - c. 640 BC)
 Archilochus of Paros (born c. 700)
 Alcman (dates unknown)
 Semonides
 Solon (ca. 638–558 BCE) 
 Mimnermus of Colophon (fl. 630-600)
 Stesichorus (640 - 555 BCE), Himera, Sicily
 Sappho (c. 630 - 570 BCE)
 Alcaeus (born c. 620 in Mytilene)
 Eumelus of Corinth (late 7th century BC)

Works
 Odyssey
 Iliad
 Theogony
 Works and Days
 Homeric Hymns
 Aethiopis [fragments]
 Little Iliad [fragments]
 Iliou persis ("Sack of Troy") [fragments]
 Nostoi [fragments]
 Telegony [fragments]
 Cypria [fragments]
 Oedipodea [fragments]
 Thebaid [fragments]
 Epigoni [fragments]
 Alcmeonis (fragments)

Middle East

Poets

Works
 King Assurbanipal's library holds tablets that include versions of the Epic of Gilgamesh and Enûma Elish

China

Poets (by date of birth)
 Lady Xu Mu

Works

Poetry by century
Poetry